Parasqualidus maii is a species of cyprinid fish endemic to Vietnam.  It is the only species in its genus.

Named in honor of Mai Dinh Yên (b. 1933), Hanoi Science University.

References
 

Cyprinid fish of Asia
Fish of Vietnam
Fish described in 2000
Gobioninae
Taxobox binomials not recognized by IUCN